Jones Academy is a Native American boarding school and dormitory for students in grades 1–12 in unincorporated Pittsburg County, Oklahoma, along Oklahoma State Highway 270, near Hartsthorne. It is operated by the Choctaw Nation and is affiliated with the Bureau of Indian Education (BIE).

It was established in 1891.

In 2006 the school proposed spending $7,162,560 to build its current  elementary facility.

Curriculum
Elementary school is provided on-site. Hartshorne Public Schools supervises the elementary academic program, and for grades 7-12 students attend Hartsthorne public schools, with Jones acting as their dormitory only. Because the institution outsources instruction for grades 7–12, the National Center for Education Statistics (NCES) counts it as a 1-6 school.

References

External links
 Jones Academy

Public elementary schools in Oklahoma
Native American boarding schools
Education in Pittsburg County, Oklahoma
Public boarding schools in the United States
1891 establishments in Oklahoma Territory
Educational institutions established in 1891
Choctaw Nation of Oklahoma